Article 519, Penal Code (Italian: Art. 519 codice penale, French: Violence charnelle) is a 1952 French-Italian crime film directed by Leonardo Cortese and starring Henri Vidal, Cosetta Greco and Paolo Stoppa. The film's sets were designed by the art director Virgilio Marchi.

Title
The movie was tentatively named as Violenza carnale (Sexual Assault), which is also the name of the article of the Italian penal code which until 1996 applied to sexual violence mentioned in the final title.

Cast
 Henri Vidal	as		Renato Berti
 Cosetta Greco	as		Clara Martini
 Paolo Stoppa	as	 	Avv. Sardi
 Rosy Mazzacurati	as	 Luisa Berti
 Giorgio Albertazzi	as	Franco, Luisa's fiancée
 Denise Grey	as	 	Clara's mother
 Emilio Cigoli	as		Clara's father
 Maria Laura Rocca	as	 Marta

References

Bibliography
 Domenico, Roy. The Devil and the Dolce Vita: Catholic Attempts to Save Italy's Soul, 1948-1974. CUA Press,  2021.

External links
 

1952 films
French drama films
1950s Italian-language films
Films directed by Leonardo Cortese
Italian drama films
1952 drama films
Italian black-and-white films
1950s Italian films
1950s French films
Italian-language French films